The Grand Theatre, Volume Two is the title of the ninth studio album from alternative country/rock band the Old 97's, released on July 5, 2011.

Track list

 "Brown Haired Daughter" - 3:31
 "I'm a Trainwreck" - 3:14
 "Perfume" - 3:04
 "The Actor" - 3:29
 "No Simple Machine" - 3:13
 "White Port" - 3:42
 "Ivy" - 4:01
 "Manhattan (I'm Done)" - 3:10
 "Marquita" - 1:26
 "Bright Spark (See What I Mean)" - 2:41
 "Visiting Hours" - 3:36
 "How Lovely All It Was" - 4:09
 "You Call It Rain" - 2:39

Personnel
Old 97's
Rhett Miller: vocals, guitars
Murry Hammond: bass, guitars, vocals, piano, harmonium 
Ken Bethea: guitars
Philip Peeples: drums, percussion, guitar on "Brown Haired Daughter"

Additional Cameos
Richard Martin: piano on "Perfume"
Audie Bethea: guitar on "White Port"

References

2011 albums
Old 97's albums
New West Records albums